Sir Charles Nicholson, 1st Baronet (23 November 1808 – 8 November 1903) was an English-Australian politician, university founder, explorer, pastoralist, antiquarian and philanthropist. The Nicholson Museum at the University of Sydney is named after him.

Early life
Nicholson was born in England, the illegitimate son of Barbara Ascough of Iburndale near Whitby in Yorkshire and christened Isaac Ascough. His father is unknown. His name was later changed. He was educated at Edinburgh University where he took the degree of MD in 1833 after submitting a thesis, written in Latin, on asphyxiation.

Early career in Australia
On 9 October 1833, Nicholson sailed for Sydney as ship's surgeon on the James Harris at the behest of his uncle, William Ascough. Ascough had made a considerable fortune as a ship's captain and owner bringing convicts to the Colony, where he had also become an extensive landowner. Nicholson arrived on 1 May 1834 and set up as a doctor in Sydney on Jamieson Street, Wynyard close to The Rocks. In 1836, William Ascough drowned at sea while sailing from Sydney to his property on the Hawkesbury River. Nicholson was the main beneficiary of his uncle's will and soon began acquiring extensive property in his own right throughout Australia.

In 1841, Nicholson blazed a cart route and shifted half a ton of tobacco from Broulee to the Monaro, in fourteen days. He was planning to return, carrying six bales of wool. William Oldrey, William Sandys Elrington, and Terence Aubrey Murray attempted to raise funds for a private road, from Bellalaba to Broulee, following Nicholson's route to the coast, but it was never built. In 1845, Nicholson bought William Sandys Elrington's estate, 'Mount Elrington', near Braidwood.

In 1843 he was one of the first elected members of the New South Wales Legislative Council as one of the representatives of Port Phillip District until 1848 and then as the representatives of the County of Argyle until 1856. He was elected speaker in 1846.

Sydney University
Nicholson took much interest in the founding of the University of Sydney and on 24 December 1850 was appointed a member of the senate. On 3 March 1851 he was unanimously elected vice-provost. He was also elected a member of the library committee which laid the foundations of the present excellent library. At the inauguration ceremony held on 11 October 1852, eloquent addresses were given by Nicholson and the first principal, Dr John Woolley, which were printed as a pamphlet and may also be found in H. E. Barff's Short Historical Account of the University of Sydney. Nicholson became chancellor in 1854 and held the position until 1862. He was most active in forwarding the interests of the university and in 1860 presented a large and valuable collection of Egyptian, Roman and Etruscan antiquities to it, collected during a trip to Egypt and the Continent in 1856–1857. Nicholson's donation of nearly 1000 artefacts was the genesis of what is today the Nicholson Museum at the University of Sydney. A catalogue of the collection was published in 1870 by the curator Edward Reeve.

Nicholson obtained donations to pay for the stained glass windows of the great hall between 1856 and 1859, himself subscribing £500. Queensland became a separate colony in 1859 and Nicholson was nominated a member of the legislative council. At the special request of the governor, Sir George Bowen, Nicholson undertook the office of president of the council for the first session of parliament.

Return to England
In 1862, Nicholson returned to England and in 1865 married Sarah Elizabeth Keightley. He never returned to Australia but kept his interest in it, and occasionally contributed papers relating to it to the journals of learned societies. 
In 1890, he was appointed to represent the interests of the Central Queensland separation league in London, and in connexion with this headed a deputation to Lord Knutsford.

Nicholson died in England on 8 November 1903 shortly before his ninety-fifth birthday. He was given the honorary degrees of D.C.L. by Oxford, and LL.D. by Cambridge and Edinburgh universities. He was knighted in 1852, and created a baronet in 1859. His eldest son, Charles Archibald Nicholson, the second baronet, became well known as an ecclesiastical architect (his achievements include the west front of St Anne's Cathedral, Belfast). His other sons were Archibald Keightley Nicholson, a stained-glass artist and Sir Sydney Hugo Nicholson, founder of the Royal School of Church Music.

In 1844 Ludwig Leichhardt named a mountain in Queensland after him.

Notes

References

 Sowada, Karin N., 'Sir Charles Nicholson: an Early Scholar-Traveller in Egypt', in K.N. Sowada and B.G. Ockinga (eds), Egyptian Art in the Nicholson Museum, Sydney (Mediterranean Archaeology, Sydney, 2006), pp. 1–13.

 

|-

}

|-

English emigrants to colonial Australia
1808 births
1903 deaths
Members of the New South Wales Legislative Council
Baronets in the Baronetage of the United Kingdom
Presidents of the Queensland Legislative Council
Australian recipients of a British baronetcy
Alumni of the University of Edinburgh
19th-century Australian politicians
Chancellors of the University of Sydney
Australian book and manuscript collectors
Presidents of the New South Wales Legislative Council